Daily Post is a Nigerian newspaper published by Daily Post Media Ltd., based in Lagos. It reports on local and national news, politics, metro, business, entertainment, sports and opinions.

In March 2015, the newspaper debuted the free distribution of its print version across Nigeria.

Awards and nominations 

Daily Post Nigeria won the "Custodian of the Nigerian Dream" Award in 2016.

References

External links 
 

Newspapers published in Lagos
Publications established in 2011
2011 establishments in Nigeria
Newspapers published in Abuja
Daily newspapers published in Nigeria